Amaral Ferrador is a municipality in the state of Rio Grande do Sul, Brazil. The population is 7,085 (2020 est.) in an area of 506.46 km². It is situated on the Camaquã River.

Economy

The main economical activities are trade, agriculture (maize, tobacco and beans) and livestock (cattle, sheep and pork).

Demography

Its population consists of 60% Portuguese ancestry, 25% Polish ancestry and 15% Afro-Brazilians.

Bounding municipalities

Camaquã
Canguçu
Dom Feliciano
Encruzilhada do Sul

See also
List of municipalities in Rio Grande do Sul

References

External links
 Official website of the prefecture
https://web.archive.org/web/20071116225345/http://www.citybrazil.com.br/rs/amaralferrador/ 

Municipalities in Rio Grande do Sul